The Indian Journal of Anaesthesia is a peer-reviewed open-access medical journal published by Medknow Publications on behalf of the Indian Society of Anaesthesiologists. It covers anaesthesiology, critical care medicine, pain and palliative care, disaster management, and trauma and emergency medicine.

Abstracting and indexing 
The journal is abstracted and indexed in:
Chemical Abstracts, CINAHL, EBSCO Publishing's Databases, Excerpta Medica/EMBASE, Expanded Academic ASAP, Health & Wellness Research Center, Health Reference Center Academic, IndMed, ProQuest, Pubmed Central, SafetyLit, Scopus, SIIC databases, Tropical Diseases Bulletin, and Ulrich's Periodicals Directory.

See also
 Open access in India

External links
 

Open access journals
Bimonthly journals
English-language journals
Medknow Publications academic journals
Publications established in 2002
Anesthesiology and palliative medicine journals
2002 establishments in India
Academic journals associated with learned and professional societies of India